is a live video album by the Japanese idol girl group Hinatazaka46, which documents the group's first concert at the Tokyo Dome on March 30–31, 2022. It was released on July 20, 2022 and is the first live video album released by the group.

Background 
Hinatazaka46 was originally scheduled to hold their first Tokyo Dome concert in December 2020 for their annual  concert, but the concert was postponed due to the COVID-19 pandemic in Japan and finally held on March 30–31, 2022 to coincide with their third debut anniversary. Nao Kosaka, who had been on hiatus due to poor health since June 2021, made her return at the concert. Both days of the concert were available on paid livestream worldwide.

On March 26, 2022, member Hiyori Hamagishi announced that she tested positive for COVID-19 and would be absent from the concert. She still appeared on the opening video and the narration video on the final part.

On the second day, the group announced the release of their seventh single "Boku Nanka" during the encore, followed by the first live performance of the title song.

Production and release 
The video album was released in three editions, each available in Blu-ray and DVD formats. The first press limited edition included both days of the concert and an additional bonus video, while the regular editions feature only either of the two days.

Commercial performance 
Hinatazaka46 3rd Anniversary Memorial Live in Tokyo Dome placed first on both the Oricon DVD and Blu-ray Charts, as well as the Music DVD and Blu-ray Chart, selling 42,000 copies in its first week.

Track listing 
The encores were split to a second disc in the DVD versions and kept on one disc in the Blu-ray versions.

Day 1

DVD: Disc 1

DVD: Disc 2 (Encore)

Day 2

DVD: Disc 1

DVD: Disc 2 (Encore)

First press limited edition

Charts and sales

Weekly charts

References

External links 
  

2022 video albums
Live video albums
Hinatazaka46
2022 concerts